Maria Isabel Coelho Santos (born 12 February 1968, in Valbom, Gondomar) is a Portuguese politician of the Socialist Party who has been a Member of the European Parliament since the 2019 elections.

Political career

Member of the Portuguese Parliament
Santos was a member of the Assembly of the Republic from 2015 until 2019 and from 2005 until 2011. During her time in parliament, she served on the Committee on Foreign Affairs. 

In addition to her committee assignments, Santos was a member of the Portuguese delegation to the Parliamentary Assembly of the Organization for Security and Co-operation in Europe. In this capacity, she served as the Assembly's vice-chair and led several election monitoring missions, including for the 2017 elections in Germany and 2018 midterm elections in the United States.

Member of the European Parliament
Since becoming a Member of the European Parliament, Santos has been serving on the Committee on Foreign Affairs and of its Subcommittee on Human Rights. She is also a member of the Democracy Support and Election Coordination Group (DEG), which oversees the Parliament's election observation missions. 

In addition to her committee assignments, Santos chairs the parliament's delegation for relations with the Mashriq countries and is a member of the delegation to the Euro-Latin American Parliamentary Assembly. She is also part of the European Parliament Intergroup on Anti-Racism and Diversity and the European Parliament Intergroup on LGBT Rights.

Other activities
 Fight Impunity, Member of the Honorary Board (–2022)

References

External links

  

1968 births
People from Gondomar, Portugal
Living people
Portuguese civil servants
20th-century Portuguese women politicians
20th-century Portuguese politicians
21st-century Portuguese women politicians
21st-century Portuguese politicians
Socialist Party (Portugal) politicians
Members of the Assembly of the Republic (Portugal)
Women members of the Assembly of the Republic (Portugal)
MEPs for Portugal 2019–2024